Monduli Juu is an administrative ward in the Monduli District of the Arusha Region of Tanzania. In 2016 the Tanzania National Bureau of Statistics report there were  12,457 people in the ward, from 15,914 in 2012.

References

Monduli District
Wards of Arusha Region